The Electoral Commission of Seychelles is the body that organise, oversee and regulate political elections in Seychelles. Currently headed by Hendrick Gappy, the body is also charged with the responsibilities of registering political parties in Seychelles.

References

External links

Elections in Seychelles
Seychelles